is a town located in Sorachi Subprefecture, Hokkaido, Japan.

As of September 2016, the town has an estimated population of 5,664. The total area is 88.05 km2.

Transportation
Naie is linked with the Dōō Expressway or the Dōō Expressway (Hokkaidō Expressway) with its interchange.

History
In the past the town flourished as a centre of the coal industry, but its population has since declined sharply.

References

External links

Official Website 

Towns in Hokkaido